Zhou Pinxi (born 23 April 2001) is a Chinese footballer currently playing as a midfielder for Jiangxi Dark Horse Junior, on loan from Guangzhou.

Career statistics

Club
.

References

2001 births
Living people
Chinese footballers
Association football midfielders
China League One players
Guangzhou F.C. players
Inner Mongolia Zhongyou F.C. players
21st-century Chinese people